The Women's 10 kilometre cross-country skiing event was part of the cross-country skiing programme at the 1980 Winter Olympics, in Lake Placid, United States. It was the eighth appearance of the event. The competition was held on 18 February 1980, at the Cross Country Skiing Stadium.

Results

References

Women's cross-country skiing at the 1980 Winter Olympics
Women's 10 kilometre cross-country skiing at the Winter Olympics
Oly
Cross